Lichenaula tholodes is a moth in the family Xyloryctidae. It was described by Turner in 1900. It is found in Australia, where it has been recorded from New South Wales and Queensland.

The wingspan is 18–21 mm. The forewings are purplish-fuscous, densely irrorated with whitish, less so along a line from the base to the anal angle. The hindwings are grey.

References

Lichenaula
Moths described in 1900